Mary Margaret Rowland (born October 8, 1961) is a United States district judge of the United States District Court for the Northern District of Illinois and a former United States magistrate judge for the same court.

Personal life and education 
Rowland was born in Akron, Ohio on October 8, 1961. She earned her Bachelor of Arts from the University of Michigan and her Juris Doctor from the University of Chicago Law School.

Rowland worked on Carl Levin's 1984 U.S. Senate campaign and served as a legal observer for Barack Obama's 2008 presidential campaign.

Legal career 
Upon graduation from law school, Judge Rowland served as a law clerk to Judge Julian Abele Cook Jr. of the United States District Court for the Eastern District of Michigan.

Prior to becoming a federal magistrate judge, she spent twelve years as a partner in the Chicago firm of Hughes, Socol, Piers, Resnick & Dym. Before entering private practice, she served for ten years in the Chicago office of the federal defender; first as a staff attorney and later as the office's chief appellate attorney.

Affiliations and memberships 
Rowland is a member of the Lesbian and Gay Bar Association of Chicago.

Federal judicial service

Magistrate judge tenure 

From 2012 to 2019, Rowland served as a United States Magistrate Judge for the Northern District of Illinois. She was officially sworn in on October 1, 2012. At the time of her appointment, she was one of only a few openly gay judges in the country.

District court service 

On June 7, 2018, President Donald Trump announced his intent to nominate Rowland to serve as a United States district judge for the United States District Court for the Northern District of Illinois. Her nomination was the result of an agreement between Trump and Illinois' two Democratic U.S. Senators. On June 18, 2018, her nomination was sent to the Senate. President Trump nominated Rowland to the seat vacated by Judge Amy J. St. Eve, who was elevated to the United States Court of Appeals for the Seventh Circuit on May 23, 2018. Rowland was President Trump's first openly gay judicial nominee. On August 22, 2018, a hearing on her nomination was held before the Senate Judiciary Committee. On October 11, 2018, her nomination was reported out of committee by a 16–5 vote.

On January 3, 2019, her nomination was returned to the President under Rule XXXI, Paragraph 6 of the United States Senate. On April 8, 2019, President Trump announced the renomination of Rowland to the district court. On May 21, 2019, her nomination was sent to the Senate. On June 20, 2019, her nomination was reported out of committee by a 14–8 vote with her opposition coming from a majority of the Republican Senators on the committee. On July 31, 2019, the Senate confirmed her nomination by voice vote. She received her judicial commission on August 20, 2019.

See also 
 List of LGBT jurists in the United States

References

External links 
 
 

1961 births
Living people
20th-century American lawyers
21st-century American lawyers
21st-century American judges
Judges of the United States District Court for the Northern District of Illinois
Lawyers from Chicago
Lesbians
LGBT appointed officials in the United States
LGBT judges
LGBT lawyers
LGBT people from Illinois
LGBT people from Ohio
People from Akron, Ohio
Public defenders
United States district court judges appointed by Donald Trump
United States magistrate judges
University of Chicago Law School alumni
University of Michigan alumni
20th-century American women lawyers
21st-century American women lawyers
21st-century American women judges